Monte Litto is a mountain of Campania, Italy. It is 700 metres above sea level.

Mountains of Campania